State Highway 40 (SH 40) is a State Highway in Kerala, India that starts in  Alappuzha and ends in Madurai, Tamil Nadu, India . The highway is 183  km long.

The Route Map 
Alappuzha – Muhamma – Thanneermukkam – Vechur Bund Road – Thalayolaparambu – Peruva – Mutholapuram -Koothattukulam –Marika - Vazhithala – Kolani – Thodupuzha – Vandamattom -Kodikulam - Chalakkamukku - Kaliyar- Vannappuram – Kanjikuzhy -Murickassery - Thopramkudy -Nedumkandam - Thookkupalam - Cumbummettu

See also 
Roads in Kerala
List of State Highways in Kerala

References 

State Highways in Kerala
Roads in Alappuzha district
Roads in Kottayam district
Roads in Idukki district
Roads in Ernakulam district